Charlotte Wassef (15 July 1912 - 17 January 1988) was an Egyptian beauty queen and Miss World 1935, born in Alexandria to an Egyptian Christian family. She was crowned Miss Egypt in 1934 and also won International Pageant of Pulchritude, the predecessor of Miss Universe, in 1935 in Brussels.

References

1912 births
Miss Egypt winners
1988 deaths
Beauty pageants in Egypt
Egyptian Christians
Egyptian emigrants to the United States